The following is a list of awards and nominations received by English actress Billie Piper.

In total, she has won and been nominated for more than 70 recognised awards. Piper is the only female actor to have won all six of the currently available Best Actress awards in UK Theatre for a single performance. This accolade was achieved by her performance in Yerma.

Theatre

BroadwayWorld Awards

Critics' Circle Theatre Awards

Drama Desk Awards

Drama League Awards

Evening Standard Theatre Awards

Glamour Awards

Laurence Olivier Awards

WhatsOnStage Awards

Television

Airlock Alpha Portal Awards

BAFTA Cymru

Broadcasting Press Guild Awards

British Academy Television Awards

Edinburgh International Television Festival

EWwy Awards

Fangoria Chainsaw Awards

Glamour Awards

National Television Awards

Rose d'Or

SFX Awards

South Bank Show Awards

Television and Radio Industries Club Awards

TV Quick Awards

Film

Göteborg Film Festival Awards

National Film Awards

SXSW Film Festival Awards

Music

Brit Awards

MTV Europe Music Awards

Smash Hits Poll Winners Party

References

Lists of awards received by British actor